The  was an infantry division of the Imperial Japanese Army. The division was formed in 1939 and was disbanded in 1945. The 36th Division was activated at Hirosaki 7 February 1939, simultaneously with 32nd, 33rd, 34th, 35th and 37th divisions.

Action
The 36th division was initially assigned to 1st army garrison duty in North China. The division was assigned to 2nd army, ordered to move south in October 1943 and reformed to seaborne division 5 November 1943, with infantry regiments absorbing artillery and engineering units. Soon the 36th division has departed Shanghai, briefly stopped at Halmahera and finally landed in Sarmi on New Guinea island. The majority of the 222nd infantry regiment was sent to Biak (forming Biak Detachment) where it was annihilated in Battle of Biak by 17 August 1944. On New Guinea, the US forces have landed in Aitape 22 April 1944 and in Sarmi 17 May 1944, squeezing 36th division to the coastal strip south of Biak. From June 1944, the fighting on New Guinea had downgraded to sporadic skirmishes, and the rest of 36th division have survived until surrender of Japan 15 August 1945 nearly unscathed, coping mostly with the problem of starvation.

See also
 List of Japanese Infantry Divisions

References

This article incorporates material from Japanese Wikipedia page 第36師団 (日本軍), accessed 17 March 2016
 
  
 

Japanese World War II divisions
Infantry divisions of Japan
Military units and formations established in 1939
Military units and formations disestablished in 1945
1939 establishments in Japan
1945 disestablishments in Japan